Xiang Tu (? – ?) was an ancient Chinese noble, an ancestor of the Shang dynasty. His family name is Zi (子), and his other name is Cheng Du (乘杜). His hometown is in Shangqiu (商丘), Henan (河南), and he was the third leader of the Shang nation.

History 
He was the son of Zhao Ming of Shang and thus the grandson of Xie of Shang, being also an ancestor of the King Tang of Shang.

In the beginning, people still did not know the horse drawn cart is used for travel. It was said that he raised horses. The horse is tamed and trained, so the horse can pull the car and become one of the important means of transportation.

It can be seen that in the time of Xiang Tu, the Shang people have migrated from the nomadic life to the life of animal husbandry and agricultural cultivation. He developed forces in the east by force, on the coast of the Yellow Sea (黃海) and in the nearby islands.

Family 
Grandfather: Xie (契) – a son of the Emperor Ku of ancient China
Father: Zhao Ming (昭明)
Son: Chang Ruo (昌若)

Bibliography 
Sima Qian. Records of the Grand Historian (史記). Volume 3.

Notes 

Shang dynasty kings